Massoudieh is a village in Akkar Governorate, Lebanon, inhabited by Alawites.

History
In 1838, Eli Smith noted  the village as el-Mas'udiyeh,  located west of esh-Sheikh Mohammed. The  inhabitants were Alawites.

Population 
The inhabitants of Massoudieh are Alawites or Sunnis.

A significant percentage of the village population have migrated to the capital city of Beirut. Also, a significant percentage of the town population have migrated overseas to countries such as Brazil, Argentina, United States of America, Canada, Australia, Mexico, Gulf Arab states and European Union (UK and France). Migration figures are high to even suggest that every family in the village would at least have or know of one friend or relative that have migrated to another country.

See also
List of cities and towns in Lebanon
List of municipalities of Lebanon

References

Bibliography

External links
Massaaoudiyeh,  Localiban

Populated places in Akkar District
Sunni Muslim communities in Lebanon
Alawite communities in Lebanon